Kenneth Ray Johnson (born January 7, 1958) is a former American football defensive back and return specialist who played ten seasons for the Atlanta Falcons and the Houston Oilers of the National Football League (NFL). He played college football at Mississippi State and was drafted by the Falcons in the fifth round of the 1980 NFL Draft.

College career
Kenny Johnson played as a defensive back and return specialist at Mississippi State for four seasons from 1976-1979. He played in all 11 games each season.

Professional career
Johnson was selected by the Atlanta Falcons in the fifth round (137th overall) of the 1980 NFL Draft. He played as a cornerback from 1980-1983 and started all 16 games in each season (he started all nine in the 1982 NFL strike-shortened season). He would switch to play as a safety for the 1984 season, where he started all 16 games. In the 1985 season, he only played in five games, starting three.

Johnson started the 1986 season with the Falcons, but ended it with the Houston Oilers. Johnson played mainly as a return specialist for the Oilers from 1986-1989, only starting three games on defense.

References

1958 births
Living people
People from Columbia, Mississippi
American football safeties
American football cornerbacks
Mississippi State Bulldogs football players
Atlanta Falcons players
Houston Oilers players